Saccharicrinis fermentans is a facultative anaerobic bacterium from the genus of Saccharicrinis which has been isolated from marine mud.

References

Bacteria described in 1955
Bacteroidia